Christopher Krause (born May 24, 1984) is a German footballer who plays as a defender or midfielder for SV Buchonia Flieden.

External links

1984 births
Living people
VfB Stuttgart II players
FC Bayern Munich II players
Bonner SC players
Association football midfielders
German footballers